Klony may refer to the following places:
Klony, Gostyń County in Greater Poland Voivodeship (west-central Poland)
Klony, Poznań County in Greater Poland Voivodeship (west-central Poland)
Klony, Warmian-Masurian Voivodeship (north Poland)